Ryan Bell (born April 17, 1984) is a retired Canadian basketball player from Orleans, Ontario (suburban Ottawa, Ontario). Bell lastly played as guard for Espoon Honka in Finland.

Bell has won four national championships as a member of Carleton University Ravens, winning in 2004, 2005, 2006 and 2007. He studied sociology at Carleton University. Before Carleton, he attended Colonel By Secondary School.

Bell joined the Canada national men's basketball team in 2006. He represented Canada at the 2007 Pan American Games and the FIBA Americas Championship 2007. Canada's team at the 2007 Pan American Games included his fellow Carleton teammates Osvaldo Jeanty and Aaron Doornekamp along with Assistant Coach Dave Smart.

Bell is a cousin of professional soccer player Jamar Dixon.

References

1984 births
Living people
Basketball players at the 2007 Pan American Games
Black Canadian basketball players
Canadian expatriate basketball people in Finland
Canadian expatriate basketball people in Germany
Carleton Ravens basketball players
Espoon Honka players
FC Schalke 04 Basketball players
Pan American Games competitors for Canada
Point guards
Shooting guards
Basketball players from Ottawa
2010 FIBA World Championship players